Arco Iris (Spanish: rainbow) or Arco-Íris (Portuguese, 'rainbow') may refer to:

Places
Arco-Íris, São Paulo, Brazil
Arco Iris, Panama

Music
Arco Iris (band), an Argentinian rock group, and the name of their first album
Arco Iris (Skybox album), 2006
Arco Iris (Amina Alaoui album), 2011
Arco Iris, a 2011 album by Atomic Garden
"Arco-Íris", a 1986 song by Carlos Paião
"Arcoiris", a song by J Balvin from Colores, 2020

Other uses
Arco Iris (party), a political party in Spain

See also

Rainbow (disambiguation)
Rainbow kick, a trick used in association football